Vexillum clathratum, common name the latticed mitre, is a species of sea snail, a marine gastropod mollusk, in the family Costellariidae, the ribbed miters.

Description
The length of the shell attains 35 mm.

(Original description) The shell is rather elongated. The spire is turreted, acuminately produced. The whorls are depressly angulated at the upper part, longitudinally ribbed, strongly latticed with close-set, raised, transverse ridges. The shell is white. The whorls are encircled round the middle  with a single light brown band. The columella is slightly umbilicated and four-plaited. The aperture is rather short.

Distribution
This marine species occurs off the Philippines; in the Indian Ocean off Mauritius.

References

External links
  Liénard, Élizé. Catalogue de la faune malacologique de l'île Maurice et de ses dépendances comprenant les îles Seychelles, le groupe de Chagos composé de Diego-Garcia, Six-îles, Pèros-Banhos, Salomon, etc., l'île Rodrigues, l'île de Cargados ou Saint-Brandon. J. Tremblay, 1877.

clathratum
Gastropods described in 1844